The Cedar Fort School is a historic two-room schoolhouse on Center Street in the center of Cedar Fort, Utah, United States. The structure was built in 1909 and reflects a Victorian Eclectic style with some Prairie School elements. It was listed on the National Register of Historic Places in 2000.

See also

 National Register of Historic Places listings in Utah County, Utah

References

External links

School buildings completed in 1909
Prairie School architecture in Utah
School buildings on the National Register of Historic Places in Utah
Victorian architecture in Utah
Schools in Utah County, Utah
National Register of Historic Places in Utah County, Utah
1909 establishments in Utah